Donegal–Leitrim was a parliamentary constituency represented in Dáil Éireann, the lower house of the Irish parliament or Oireachtas from 1969 to 1977. The constituency elected 3 deputies (Teachtaí Dála, commonly known as TDs) to the Dáil, on the system of proportional representation by means of the single transferable vote (PR-STV).

History and boundaries
The constituency was created under the Electoral (Amendment) Act 1969, and first used at the 1969 general election to the 19th Dáil. It was used again for the 1973 general election to the 20th Dáil.

The constituency was used for one electoral revision only, being abolished under the Electoral (Amendment) Act 1974. The areas in County Donegal were mostly incorporated into the new Donegal constituency, while the more northerly Leitrim territories and the southern area of Donegal (around Bundoran and Ballyshannon), were incorporated into the substantially revised Sligo–Leitrim constituency.

It was defined in the 1969 Act as:

TDs

Elections

1973 general election

1970 by-election 
Following the death of Fine Gael TD Patrick O'Donnell, a by-election was held on 2 December 1970. The seat was won by the Fianna Fáil candidate Patrick Delap.

1969 general election

See also 
Dáil constituencies
Politics of the Republic of Ireland
Historic Dáil constituencies
Elections in the Republic of Ireland

References

External links 
Oireachtas Members Database

Dáil constituencies in the Republic of Ireland (historic)
Historic constituencies in County Donegal
Historic constituencies in County Leitrim
1969 establishments in Ireland
1977 disestablishments in Ireland
Constituencies established in 1969
Constituencies disestablished in 1977